A list of films produced in Spain in 1967 (see 1967 in film).

1967

References

Footnotes

Sources

External links
 Spanish films of 1967 at the Internet Movie Database

1967
Spanish
Films